The Welsh Rugby Union League 2 East (also called the SWALEC League 2 East for sponsorship reasons) is a rugby union league in Wales.

Competition format and sponsorship

Competition
There are 12 clubs in the WRU League 2 East. During the course of a season (which lasts from September to May) each club plays the others twice, once at their home ground and once at that of their opponents for a total of 22 games for each club, with a total of 132 games in each season. Teams receive four points for a win and two point for a draw, an additional bonus point is awarded to either team if they score four tries or more in a single match. No points are awarded for a loss though the losing team can gain a bonus point for finishing the match within seven points of the winning team. Teams are ranked by total points, then the number of tries scored and then points difference. At the end of each season, the club with the most points is crowned as champion. If points are equal the tries scored then points difference determines the winner. The team who is declared champion at the end of the season is eligible for promotion to the WRU League 1 East. The three lowest placed teams are relegated into the WRU Division Three East or WRU Division Three South East depending on geographical location.

Sponsorship 
In 2008 the Welsh Rugby Union announced a new sponsorship deal for the club rugby leagues with SWALEC valued at £1 million (GBP). The initial three year sponsorship was extended at the end of the 2010/11 season, making SWALEC the league sponsors until 2015. The leagues sponsored are the WRU Divisions one through to seven.

 (2002-2005) Lloyds TSB
 (2005-2008) Asda
 (2008-2015) SWALEC

2011/2012 Season

League teams
 Abercynon RFC 
 Bedlinog RFC
 Fleur De Lys RFC
 Heol y Cyw RFC
 Llantrisant RFC
 Llantwit Fardre RFC
 Penallta RFC
 Rhydyfelin RFC
 Rhymney RFC
 Tylorstown RFC
 Ynysybwl RFC
 Ystrad Rhondda

2011/2012 Table

2010/2011 Season

League teams
 Brynmawr RFC
 Caerphilly RFC
 Fleur De Lys RFC
 Llantrisant RFC
 Llantwit Fardre RFC
 Mountain Ash RFC
 Penallta RFC
 Penarth RFC
 Rhydyfelin RFC
 Tredegar RFC
 Tylorstown RFC
 Ynysybwl RFC

2010/2011 Table

2009/2010 Season

League teams
 Abercynon RFC
 Brynmawr RFC
 Gilfach Goch RFC
 Garndiffaith RFC
 Llantrisant RFC
 Llantwit Fardre RFC
 Mountain Ash RFC
 Newport Saracens RFC
 Penallta RFC
 Rhydyfelin RFC
 Treorchy RFC
 Ynysybwl RFC

2009/2010 Table

2008/2009 Season

League teams
 Abercynon RFC
 Abergavenny RFC
 Bedlinog RFC
 Brynmawr RFC
 Fleur De Lys RFC
 Gilfach Goch RFC
 Llantrisant RFC
 Mountain Ash RFC
 Rhydyfelin RFC
 Tredegar RFC
 Treherbert RFC
 Ynysybwl RFC

2008/2009 Table

2007/2008 Season 

At the end of the season Ystrad Rhondda were crowned champions and gained promotion to the Division One East league, along with second placed Penallta. Newport High School Old Boys and Pill Harriers were relegated to Division Three East, while Llanishen were relegated to Division Three South East.

League teams
 Abercynon RFC
 Builth Wells RFC
 Llanishen RFC
 Mountain Ash RFC
 Newport High School Old Boys RFC
 Pill Harriers RFC
 Penallta RFC
 Rhydyfelin RFC
 Tredegar RFC
 Treherbert RFC
 Ynysybwl RFC
 Ystrad Rhondda RFC

2007/2008 Table

2006/2007 Season 

See 2006–07 in Welsh rugby union

Winners
{| class="wikitable"
|-
! Season !! Winners !! Name of league
|-
|2006-07||Llantrisant RFC||rowspan=2|WRU Division Two East
|-
|2007-08||Ystrad Rhondda RFC
|-
|2008-09||Tredegar RFC||rowspan=7|WRU League 2 East
|-
|2009-10||Gilfach Goch RFC
|-
|2010-11||Mountain Ash RFC
|-
|2011-12||Ystrad Rhondda RFC
|-
|2012-13||Bedlinog RFC
|-
|2013-14||Rhiwbina RFC
|-
|2014-15||
|-
|2015-16||
|-
|2016-17||Dinas Powys RFC
|-
|2017-18||Gilfach Goch RFC
|-
|2018-19||St.Peters RFC

References

4